Let Me Explain Something to You About Art is a studio album by composer and producer Kramer, released in 1998 by Tzadik Records.

Production
Deni Bonet contributed the accordion and strings; Kramer played everything else.

Track listing

Personnel 
Adapted from Let Me Explain Something to You About Art liner notes.

Musicians
 Deni Bonet – violin, viola, accordion
 Kramer – bass guitar, keyboard, sampler, tape, production, engineering, mastering
Additional personnel
 Herbert Meyer – voice
 Margaret Zwoller – voice

Production
 Michael Macioce – photography
 Ikue Mori – design
 Allan Tucker – mastering
 John Zorn – executive producer

Release history

References

External links 
 Let Me Explain Something to You About Art at Discogs (list of releases)

1998 albums
Kramer (musician) albums
Albums produced by Kramer (musician)
Tzadik Records albums